Aforia serranoi is a species of sea snail, a marine gastropod mollusc in the family Cochlespiridae.

Description
The length of the shell attains 35 mm. The fusiform shell contains eight whorls. It shows predominant spiral cords, two keels (one in the middle of the whorls and one on the body whorl) and fine spiral threads.

Distribution
This species is found in deep waters (at a depth of 1720 m) of the Atlantic Ocean off the Galicia Bank off the Iberian Peninsula.

References

External links
 Gofas S., Kantor Y. & Luque Á. A. (2014). A new Aforia (Gastropoda: Conoidea: Cochlespiridae) from Galicia Bank (NW Iberian Peninsula). Iberus. 32(1): 45–51
  Serge GOFAS, Ángel A. LUQUE, Joan Daniel OLIVER,José TEMPLADO & Alberto SERRA (2021) - The Mollusca of Galicia Bank (NE Atlantic Ocean); European Journal of Taxonomy 785: 1–114

serranoi
Gastropods described in 2014